Lepidochrysops gydoae, the Gydo blue, is a butterfly of the family Lycaenidae. It is found in South Africa, where it is restricted to fynbos on the northern slopes of the Gydo Mountain and the Theronsberg in the Western Cape.

Adults are on wing from November to January. There is one generation per year.

The larvae probably feed on Selago species.

References

Gydoae
Endemic butterflies of South Africa
Butterflies described in 1994